Sokil may refer to:
 Sokil Kyiv, Ukrainian professional ice hockey team
 Maria Sokil (1902–1999), Ukrainian opera singer
 List of places named Sokil, several rural settlements in Ukraine

See also
 
 Sokal (disambiguation)
 Sokol (disambiguation)